The Football League play-offs for the 1994–95 season were held in May 1995, with the finals taking place at Wembley Stadium in London. The play-off semi-finals were played over two legs and were contested by the teams who finished in 2nd, 3rd, 4th and 5th place in the Football League First Division and Football League Second Division and the 3rd, 4th, 5th, and 6th placed teams in the Football League Third Division table. The winners of the semi-finals progressed through to the finals, with the winner of these matches gaining promotion for the following season.

Background
The Football League play-offs have been held every year since 1987. They take place for each division following the conclusion of the regular season and are contested by the four clubs finishing below the automatic promotion places.

First Division

Semi-finals
First leg

Second leg

Bolton Wanderers won 3–2 on aggregate.

Reading won 3–1 on aggregate.

Final

Second Division

Semi-finals
First leg

Second leg

Crewe Alexandra 1–1 Bristol Rovers on aggregate. Bristol Rovers won on away goals.

Brentford 2–2 Huddersfield Town on aggregate. Huddersfield Town won 4–3 on penalties.

Final

Third Division

Semi-finals
First leg

Second leg

Bury won 2–0 on aggregate.

Chesterfield won 6–3 on aggregate.

Final

External links
Football League website

 
English Football League play-offs